Armaan is a Hindi film directed by Anand Sagar, starring Raj Babbar, Shakti Kapoor, Shammi Kapoor, Ranjeeta Kaur, Dev Kumar, Deepak Parashar and as a guest star Kalpana Iyer and Prema Narayan in song "Mere Jaesi Haseena". It is loosely based on the 1942 Hollywood classic Casablanca.

Plot 
This film tells the story of the Indian freedom struggle against the Portuguese occupation in Goa.

Deepak Parashar plays a freedom
fighter, Raj Babbar a bar owner,
Ranjeeta Kaur the shared love interest,
Shammi Kapoor the bar piano player
and Shakti Kapoor the freeloading
Portuguese Captain Gomes. Starts off in
Dharampur then migrates to Goa which
is then under Portuguese occupation.
The banter between Shammi Kapoor
and Shakti Kapoor, referring to Captain
Gomes as HK - Holy King to his face,
Haram Khor (freeloader) behind his
back, lends a comedic touch.

Cast 
Raj Babbar
Shakti Kapoor
Shammi Kapoor
Ranjeeta Kaur
Dev Kumar
Deepak Parashar
Kalpana Iyer
Prema Narayan

Soundtrack 

All the songs in this film were composed by Bappi Lahiri, and the lyrics were written by Indeewar and Anjaan. The Bollywood disco song "Ramba Ho Ho Ho Samba Ho Ho Ho" was listed at #21 on Binaca Geetmala annual list 1981. Another popular song was "Mere Jaesi Haseena", a song in the Indian-Trinidadian hybrid style known as Chutney.

Accolades 
 Nomination Filmfare Award for Best Music Director - Bappi Lahiri
 Nomination Filmfare Award for Best Female Playback Singer - Usha Uthup for the song "Ramba Ho Ho Ho Samba Ho Ho Ho"
 Nomination Filmfare Award for Best Female Playback Singer - Sharon Prabhakar for the song "Mere Jaesi Haseena"

References

External links 
 

 Films scored by Bappi Lahiri
 1980s Hindi-language films